Step II is the fourth studio album by American singer Sylvester, released in 1978 on the Fantasy label.

Commercial performance
The album peaked at No. 7 on the R&B albums chart. It also reached No. 28 on the Billboard 200. The album features the singles "Dance (Disco Heat)", which peaked at No. 4 on the Hot Soul Singles chart and No. 19 on the Billboard Hot 100, and "You Make Me Feel (Mighty Real)", which charted at No. 20 on the Hot Soul Singles chart and No. 36 on the Billboard Hot 100. Both songs reached No. 1 on the Hot Dance Club Play chart.  The album was certified Gold by the RIAA on February 13, 1979.

Track listing

Personnel 
Sylvester - lead vocals and backing vocals, acoustic piano
Patrick Cowley - string, Electro-comp 101 and 200 models synthesizers and Oberheim DS-2 sequencer, special effects
Michael Finden - electric piano, organ and clavinet
James "Tip" Wirrick - electric guitar
Eric Robinson - acoustic piano (track 7)
Bob Kingson - bass (tracks 1-6)
James Jamerson, Jr. - bass (track 7)
Randy Merritt - drums (tracks 1-6)
James Gadson - drums (track 7)
David Frazier - percussion
George Bohanon - horns
Charles Veal Jr. - strings, concertmaster
Izora Rhodes, Martha Wash - backing vocals
Leslie Drayton - string and horn arrangements
Technical
Nancy C. Pitts - associate producer
Eddie Bill Harris - remix
Phil Bray - photography

Charts
Album

Singles

References

External links

1978 albums
Sylvester (singer) albums
Albums produced by Harvey Fuqua
Fantasy Records albums